The Jordan Lake Educational State Forest (JLESF) is a  is a North Carolinian State Forest near Apex, North Carolina.  It is located beside the over 46,768 acre (186 km²) Jordan Lake.

See also
Jordan Lake State Recreation Area
Jordan Lake

References

External links 
 

Protected areas of Chatham County, North Carolina
North Carolina state forests
Education in Chatham County, North Carolina
Open-air museums in North Carolina